Uttarakhand Devabhumi Matribhumi (English: Uttarakhand, Land of the Gods, O Motherland!) is the official state song of the Indian state of Uttarakhand.

The song was written by Hemant Bisht and composed by noted Uttarakhandi folk singer and musician Narendra Singh Negi.

This song is trilingual with first three of its seven verses written in Hindi, while the last four verses are written in Garhwali and Kumaoni languages.

The song is a hymn, praising Uttarakhand as a divine motherland. The theme is set to reflect the geography, ecology, fauna and flora, culture, festivals, music, cuisine, arts, and lifestyle of the people of Uttarakhand.

Background
In July 2015, a six-member State Song Selection Committee chaired by Laxman Singh Bisht 'Batrohi' was constituted by the Department of Culture of Uttarakhand Government for the selection of state song. At the selection committee's sixth meet on 19 January 2016, the song Uttarakhand Devabhumi Matribhumi penned by Hemant Bisht, a lecturer of Biology at the Government Inter College, Nainital was finally selected as the official state song among 203 entries it received from all-over India.
On 6 February 2016, the song was approved and adopted by the Uttarakhand Council of Ministers headed by then Chief Minister of Uttarakhand Harish Rawat, as the official state song of Uttarakhand.

Lyrics

See also
Emblem of Uttarakhand
List of Uttarakhand state symbols
Music of Uttarakhand
Bedu Pako Baro Masa
Jana Gana Mana
Vande Mataram
List of Indian state songs
List of regional anthems

References

External links
Uttarakhand Devabhumi Matribhumi

 Must See 14 Monuments In Uttarakhand, Travel with Thinkarya, 26 Feb 2021.

Uttarakhand
Indian state songs
Symbols of Uttarakhand